Durango Automotive SRL was an Italian auto racing team founded in 1980 by Ivone Pinton and Enrico Magro, which competed in Formula 3000, the 24 Hours of Le Mans and the GP2 Series. The team finished racing after withdrawing from the Italian round of the 2009 GP2 Series season, although it was linked to Jacques Villeneuve and his bid to return to Formula One for the 2011 season.

History 

The Durango team took part in the Italian Formula Three Championship from 1987 to 1992. They expanded to compete in the International Formula 3000 Championship and the British Formula Two Championship in 1991, and entered a Lancia LC2 in the 1991 24 Hours of Le Mans, under the banner of Veneto Equipe. Durango took part in the Renault Formula Two championship and Euroseries in 1994 and continued to race in Formula Three until 1999.

In 2003, Durango designed and built a Le Mans Prototype car, the PM02, to compete in the FIA Sportscar championship and the Le Mans 24 Hours. The car was powered by a Judd GV4 V10 engine. The team participated for the 2nd time in the 24 Hours of Le Mans and finished in 24th position, after qualifying 18th. The car's best result was a 4th place at the Estoril round of the FIA sportscar championship. The car was never raced again after the 2003 season.

In 2005, Durango became part of the GP2 Series, a new series designed to help young drivers enter into Formula One. In 2006, the team participated in Formula Azzurra, a series supported by the Italian Karting Federation. Due to financial problems the team was forced to withdraw from the final races of the 2009 GP2 Series season, and pulled out of competing in the 2009-10 GP2 Asia Series season.

Formula One entry bid 
Durango attempted to enter Formula One in 2010, when the Fédération Internationale de l'Automobile opened an entry process for an additional thirteenth team. The team principal Ivone Pinton stated there were investors only interested with competing in F1, and announced a partnership with 1997 Formula One champion Jacques Villeneuve. The team would compete as Villeneuve Racing and Villeneuve would initially be one of the two drivers. The FIA did not accept any of the applications for the 2011 season.

Results

GP2 Series

In detail 
(key) (Races in bold indicate pole position) (Races in italics indicate fastest lap)

Formula 3000

In detail 
(key) (Races in bold indicate pole position; races in italics indicate fastest lap)

Sports car

Other Series History

References 

Italian auto racing teams
GP2 Series teams
GP3 Series teams
International Formula 3000 teams
24 Hours of Le Mans teams
Formula Renault Eurocup teams
1980 establishments in Italy
2016 disestablishments in Italy
Auto racing teams established in 1980
Auto racing teams disestablished in 2016
Auto GP teams
World Series Formula V8 3.5 teams
FIA Sportscar Championship entrants